The Majeerteen (also spelled Majerteen, Macherten, Majertain, or Mijurtin) is a sub-clan of the Harti Darod. It is one of the major Somali groups, with a vast traditional territory spanning 3 major regions of Somalia: Bari, Nugaal and Mudug. From Bosaso down to Garacad, the Majerteen settle in what is literally considered to be the 'Horn of Africa'. They can also be found in Kismayo in southern Somalia. They primarily inhabit the Puntland state of northern Somalia.

Overview
The Majeerteen Sultanates played an important role in the pre-independence era of Somalia. The Majeerteen also held many other significant government posts in the 1960s and 1970s, and continue to play a key role in Puntland state and Somalia as a whole.

For the treaty between the Majeerteen and colonial powers, see "treaties".

Distribution
The Majeerteen are traditionally settled in Somalia's northern regions of Bari, Nugal and Mudug. They can also be found in Kismayo in southern Somalia due to migrations starting in the 19th century along with their fellow members of the larger Harti subclan, the Dhulbahante, Dishiishe and Warsangeli.

The Majeerteen are traditionally settled in the land in-between  Murcanyo, Bandar Siyad an ancient port town facing the Gulf of Aden, and Garacad a coastal port town, facing the Indian Ocean and all the land in between which corresponds to the area encompassing the Horn of Africa. Therefore, the Majerteen are settled in what is literally considered to be 'the Horn of Africa'.

Some Majeerteen people are also found in the Somali Region in Ethiopia, specifically in the Dollo Zone near the Somalia border.

The Majeerteen are part of Darod subclans within Somalia.

The Majeerteen are more commonly found in the cities of Bosaso, Garowe and Galkacyo which are all regional capitals of Bari, Somalia, Nugal, Somalia and Mudug respectively.

The Osman Mahmud (Cismaan Maxamuud), Omar Mahmud (Cumar Maxamuud), and Isse Mahmoud (Ciise Maxamuud) comprise the Maxamuud Saleebaan. Maxamed Talareer also known as WADALMOGE is another major subclan which a 2010 study identifies as both the main division of Majeerteen and a central and unifying entity in Puntland. During the 1960s, the Ali Saleebaan (or Cali Saleebaan), Wadalmoge and Ciise Maxamuud formed a powerful business class in Kismayo, while Siad Barre exploited a rivalry between the Cali Saleebaan and Cumar Maxamuud in an effort to weaken the Majeerteen in general. Historically, the Cali Saleebaan formed part of a coastal trading network around Bosaso, along with other subclans.

Majeerteen Sultanates

Before the famous Majeerteen Sultanate there was the Sultanate of Amaanle (Abdirahman Awe) which was overthrown and overtaken by Osman Mahamuud who became the subsequent King and Sultan. The Majeerteen Sultanate was founded in the early-16th century. It rose to prominence in the 19th century, under the reign of the resourceful King (Boqor) Osman Mahamuud. His Sultanate controlled Bari Karkaar, Nugaaal and also central Somalia in the 19th and early 20th centuries. The polity maintained a robust trading network, entered into treaties with foreign powers, and exerted strong centralized authority on the domestic front.

Osman Mahamuud's Sultanate was nearly destroyed in the late-1800s by a power struggle between himself and his ambitious cousin, Yusuf Ali Kenadid who founded the Sultanate of Hobyo in 1878. Initially he wanted to seize control of the neighbouring Majeerteen Sultanate, ruled by his cousin Boqor Osman Mahamud. However, Yusuf Ali Kenadid was unsuccessful in his endeavour, and was eventually forced into exile in Yemen. A decade later, in the 1870s, Yusuf Ali Kenadid returned from the Arabian Peninsula with a band of Hadhrami musketeers and a group of devoted lieutenants. With their assistance, he managed to overpower the local Hawiye clans and establish the Kingdom of Hobyo in 1878.

As with the Majeerteen Sultanate, the Sultanate of Hobyo exerted a strong centralized authority during its existence, and possessed all of the organs and trappings of an integrated modern state: a functioning bureaucracy, a hereditary nobility, titled aristocrats, a state flag, as well as a professional army. Both sultanates also maintained written records of their activities, which still exist.

In the late 19th century, all extant northern Somali monarchs entered into treaties with one of the colonial powers, Abyssinia, Britain or Italy, except for the Dhulbahante. Likewise, in late 1889, Boqor Osman entered into a treaty with the Italians, making his realm an Italian protectorate. His rival Sultan Kenadid had signed a similar agreement vis-a-vis his own Sultanate the year before. Both rulers had signed the protectorate treaties to advance their own expansionist objectives, with Boqor Osman looking to use Italy's support in his ongoing power struggle with Kenadid over the Majeerteen Sultanate. Boqor Osman and Sultan Kenadid also hoped to exploit the conflicting interests among the European imperial powers that were then looking to control the Somali peninsula, so as to avoid direct occupation of their territories by force.

The relationship between the Sultanate of Hobyo and Italy soured when Sultan Kenadid refused the Italians' proposal to allow a British contingent of troops to disembark in his Sultanate so that they might then pursue their battle against Mohammed Abdullah Hassan's Dervish forces. Viewed as too much of a threat by the Italians, Sultan Kenadid was eventually exiled to Aden in Yemen and then to Eritrea, as was his son Ali Yusuf, the heir apparent to his throne.

Osman Yusuf Kenadid, the son of the first Sultan Yusuf Ali Kenadid, was a famous poet and scholar. Osman Yusuf Kenadid was the inventor of the first phonetically standard script for the Somali language in the 1920s, the Osmanya Script.

Lineage
There is no clear agreement on the clan and sub-clan structures and many lineages are omitted. The following listing is taken from the World Bank's Conflict in Somalia: Drivers and Dynamics from 2005 and the United Kingdom's Home Office publication, Somalia Assessment 2001.

 Shiekh Darod (Daarood bin Ismaciil)
 Marehan
 Red Dini
 Rer Hassan
 Cali Dheere
 Kabalah
 Absame
 Ogaden
 Makabul
 Mohamed Zubeir
 Aulihan
Bah-geri
 Jidwaq
 Harti
 Dhulbahante (Dolbahante)
 Dishiishe (Dishishe)
 Warsangali (Warsengeli)
 Majeerteen (Mijerteen)
Wabeeneeye
Idigfale (Muuse Noleys)
Danweyne (Abdalle Noleys)
Amaanle
Guddoonwaaq
Filkucaag
Amartiwaaq
Tabale
Ali Jibraahiil
Nuux Jibrahiil
Cabdirixiin Ibraahim
cabdale ibrahim
adan ibrahim
rer maxamud
Wadalmoge
Maxamed muuse
Ismail maxamed
Cali maxamed 
Abokor maxamed 
Nuux maxamed 
Baraale maxamed 
Idiris muuse 
Rer Faahiye 
Rer ciise 
Rooble Cawlyahan 
Ilka dheer 
Reer Umar
Reer Maxamuud
Abukar Maxamuud
Faarax Ismacil
Ciise Ismacil
Maxamed Ismacil
Qaasin Maxamuud
Maxamed Qaasin
Axmed Qaasin
Aadan Qaasin
Bare Qaasin
Ibraahim Qaasin
Reer Bicidyahan
Siwaaqroon
Abdirahman
Adan Abdiraxman
Ibrahim Abdisamad
Yoonis Abdisamad
Mohamud Abdisamad
Cawlyahan (Obokor Abdiraxman)
Ciise Cawlyahan
Jibriil Cawlyahan
Hashim Cawlyahan
Mohammed
Ugaar Saleebaan
 Ibrahim Aadan
 Hussein Aadan
Ismail Saleebaan
Ali Saleebaan
Bicidyahan Ali
Auliyahan Ali
Omar Ali
Adam Ali
Ismail Ali
Maxamuud Saleebaan
Cismaan Maxamuud
Cumar Maxamuud
Ciise Maxamuud

Groups
Taargooye, an exclusively Majeerteen Darawiish administrative division and disbanded in 1910 when its constituents became mutinous
SSDF was a predominantly Majeerteen political group from the 1980s to 1990s

Notable people

Royalty
 Abdulkadir Isse Ahmed Salah, Sultan of the Ugaar Saleebaan of Majeerteen
 Ali Yusuf Kenadid, last Sultan of the Sultanate of Hobyo
 Osman Mahamuud, King of the Majeerteen Sultanate (mid-1800s-early 1900s)
 Yusuf Ali Kenadid, founder of the Sultanate of Hobyo

Military
 Abdullahi Ahmed Irro, Somali General, founded the National Academy for Strategy
 Siciid Jigrati, mentioned in Geoffrey Archer's 1916 important members of Darawiish haroun list
 Abshir Dhoorre, mentioned in Geoffrey Archer's 1916 important members of Darawiish haroun list
 Xirsi Bile, mentioned in Geoffrey Archer's 1916 important members of Darawiish haroun list
 Jama Ali Jama, Colonel in the Somali military and former President of Puntland
 Mohamed Abshir Muse, first commander of the Somali Police Force

Enterprisers
 Ali A. Abdi, sociologist and educationist, professor of education and international development, the University of British Columbia.
 Ali Haji Warsame, entrepreneur, former Chief Executive Officer of Golis Telecom Somalia
 Iman (Zara Mohamed Abdulmajid), Somali-American fashion model, actress, entrepreneur and philanthropist. She is the widow of English rock musician David Bowie.
 Maxamed Daahir Afrax, novelist, playwright, journalist and scholar
 Mohammed Awale Liban, designed the flag of Somalia
 Omar A. Ali, entrepreneur, accountant, financial consultant, philanthropist, and leading specialist on Islamic finance.
 Shire Haji Farah, entrepreneur, and Executive Committee Member of the Somali Business Council
 Yaasiin Cismaan Keenadiid, traditional Somali linguist
 Yasin Haji Osman Sharmarke, leader and co-founder of the Somali Youth League
 Osman Yusuf Kenadid, inventor of the Osmanya writing script

Politicians

 Abdirashid Shermarke, first Prime Minister of Somalia, second President of Somalia (1967–1969)
 Abdirizak Haji Hussein, former Prime Minister of Somalia (1964–1967), and former Secretary General of the Somali Youth League
 Abdullahi Yusuf Ahmed, former President of Somalia, President of Puntland and co-founder of the Somali Salvation Democratic Front
 Abdulqawi Yusuf, lawyer and judge at the International Court of Justice
 Abdiweli Mohamed Ali, former Prime Minister of Somalia, and former President of Puntland
 Ali Abdi Aware, former Puntland State Minister of the Presidency for International Relations and Social Affairs
 Asha Gelle Dirie, former Minister of Women Development and Family Affairs of Puntland; founder and Executive Director of TAG Foundation
 Ayaan Hirsi Ali, Dutch politician, the first Somali-born member of parliament of a European country, author and political activist
 Farah Ali Jama, former Minister of Finance of Puntland 
 Haji Bashir Ismail Yusuf, first President of the Somali National Assembly; Minister of Health and Labor of Somalia (1966–1967)
 Hassan Abshir Farah, former Mogadishu mayor, Somalia ambassador to Japan and later to Germany, interior minister of Puntland
 Hassan Ali Mire, first Minister of Education of the Somali Democratic Republic; former Chairman of the Somali Salvation Democratic Front (SSDF).
 Hirsi Magan Isse, scholar and revolutionary leader with the Somali Salvation Democratic Front (SSDF).
 Ilhan Omar, Somali-American politician, member of the United States House of Representatives for Minnesota's 5th congressional district since 2019
 Mire Hagi Farah Mohamed, Somali Finance Minister 2004–2006, and former mayor of Kismayo
 Mohamed Abdi Aware, Puntland judge and member of Supreme Judicial Council.
 Mohammed Said Hersi Morgan, son-in-law of Siad Barre and minister of defense of Somalia
 Mohamud Muse Hersi, third President of Puntland
 Said Abdullahi Dani, former Minister of Planning of Somalia, current President of Puntland
 Saida Haji Bashir Ismail, former Somali Finance Vice-Minister in the TNG (2000-2004)

 Omar Samatar, Fought against Italian occupation of Hobyo after the surrender of the Sultan of Hobyo
 Omar Sharmarke, former Prime Minister of Somalia, and son of Abdirashid Ali Sharmarke
 Yusuf Mohamed Ismail, former Ambassador of Somalia to the United Nations Human Rights Office in Geneva
 Yusuf Osman Samatar, politician

References

External links
 The Majeerteen Sultanates

Somali clans
Somali clans in Ethiopia